The Battle of Jeddah was fought in 1813 at the west Arabian port city of Jeddah as part of the Ottoman–Saudi War. The Ottoman army of Tusun Pasha retreated from Medina which had been captured by the Saudis, and a new army led by his father Muhammad Ali Pasha arrived from Egypt. The combined forces quickly marched to defend the city of Jeddah immediately from the advancing Saudis, and the Ottoman puppet ruler Ghalib ibn Musa'id was sent to Constantinople as a prisoner to avoid any sort of cooperation between him and the Arab rebels. A few days later, the Saudi forces captured Jeddah and forced the Ottoman army to retreat. Sultan Mahmud II tried to negotiate with the Saudi rebels by using Ghalib Efendi as a negotiation tool however the negotiations failed and Ghalib ibn Musa'id was instead exiled to Egypt and later Selanik by the Ottomans. Jeddah then came under Saudi rule after this battle.

See also
Battle of Jeddah (1925)
History of Saudi Arabia

1813 in Asia
1813 in the Ottoman Empire
Jeddah 1813
Jeddah
19th century in Saudi Arabia
First Saudi State
Jeddah 1813
History of Jeddah